Ngozi may refer to:

People
 Ngozi Okonjo-Iweala (born 1954), finance minister of Nigeria
 Ngozi Monu (born 1981), Nigerian swimmer
 Ngozi Onwurah, British-Nigerian film director
 Ngozi Ezeonu, Nigerian actress
 Ngozi Olejeme, Nigerian philanthropist
 Ngozi Ukazu, American cartoonist and graphic novelist

Places
 Commune of Ngozi, Burundi
 Lake Ngozi, a crater lake in Tanzania
 Ngozi, Burundi, a city in Burundi
 Ngozi Province, Burundi